Lejos de Frin is a novel by Argentine author Luis Pescetti. It was first published in 2005.

Books by Luis Pescetti
2005 novels